John Flynn (29 June 1890 – 28 May 1952) was an Australian cricketer. He played two first-class matches for New South Wales in 1914/15.

See also
 List of New South Wales representative cricketers

References

External links
 

1890 births
1952 deaths
Australian cricketers
New South Wales cricketers
Cricketers from Sydney